The tornado outbreak of January 10–11, 2020 was a two-day severe weather event stretching from the South-Central Plains eastward into the Southeast United States. An eastward-moving shortwave trough tracked across the continental United States through that two-day period, combining with abundant moisture, instability, and wind shear to promote the formation of a long-lived squall line. Hundreds of damaging wind reports were received, and 80 tornadoes occurred within this line, making it the third largest January tornado outbreak on record. Three tornadoes—an EF1 in eastern Texas, an EF2 in northern Louisiana, and an EF2 in western Alabama—led to a total of seven deaths, all in mobile homes. There were five other storm related deaths, including two due to icy roads in Lubbock, Texas, one due to drowning in Oklahoma, and one due to icy roads in Iowa. The system also brought a monthly record high temperature to Boston and Bridgeport. Extensive damage and several other injuries occurred as well. The severe weather event was notable in that it was forecast well in advance, with the Storm Prediction Center first highlighting the risk area a full week beforehand. Total damage from the event reached $1.1 billion according to the National Centers for Environmental Information.

Meteorological synopsis
Beginning on January 5, the Storm Prediction Center (SPC) highlighted the potential for organized severe weather across central Texas eastward into far western Georgia valid for January 10–11. The day 7 outlook issued that day constituted only the fourth time a severe weather risk had been delineated a week in advance in January, alongside January 23, 2013, January 18, 2010, and January 1, 2008. Despite the unusually high confidence at a long lead time, the threat region aligned well with climatologically favored areas for severe weather during the month. On January 6, the day 6 outlook for January 10 raised portions of northeastern Texas, northwestern Louisiana, southeastern Oklahoma, and southern Arkansas to a 30% probability of severe weather, equivalent to an Enhanced risk. Much of Alabama and Mississippi, in addition to a small section of both Louisiana and Florida, were upgraded to an Enhanced risk in the following day's outlook as well. On January 9, after days of refining the risk area, the SPC elevated northeastern Texas, northern Louisiana, and far southern Arkansas to a Moderate risk. Although the Moderate risk was initially issued given high confidence in a widespread damaging wind event, including the potential for a derecho, the morning outlook on January 10 raised the potential for strong, long-tracked tornadoes across eastern Texas, northern Louisiana, southern Arkansas, and extreme western Mississippi.

At the start of the day, a cold front was analyzed from south-central Kansas southwestward into an area of low pressure across the Texas Panhandle. In advance of this front, persistent warm-air advection led to quickly-rising dewpoints across western Oklahoma and far south-central Kansas. Aloft, a deep shortwave trough across the Southwestern United States pushed eastward, resulting in cold mid-level temperatures and the development of a modestly unstable environment. In the presence of strong wind shear, and given the impetus for convective development, thunderstorms mainly capable of a severe hail threat began to form throughout the morning hours. Intensifying thunderstorms farther east across central and eastern Oklahoma led to the day's first tornado watch at 16:40 UTC. Numerous other tornado and severe thunderstorm watches were issued as the day progressed. As the cold front shifted eastward, a line of thunderstorms developed along this boundary from southern Missouri down into central Texas. Despite the expectation that supercells capable of strong tornadoes would precede this line, convection instead failed to organize in an unstable but slightly capped environment. The SPC ultimately decided to downgrade tornado probabilities and remove the hatched area denoting the potential for strong tornadoes in their 01:00 UTC outlook.

Throughout the overnight hours, the southern edge of the convective line surged eastward at an increasing rate, leading to interaction with pre-frontal thunderstorms that increased rotation in an already volatile environment. Numerous embedded rotations and semi-discrete supercell structures formed within the line, producing many tornadoes. An EF1 tornado west-southwest of Nacogdoches, Texas, led to the death of one person, while a long-tracked EF2 tornado that tracked from southeast of Bossier City to north of Arcadia, Louisiana, led to three more fatalities. All four deaths from these two tornadoes were in mobile homes. By the afternoon hours of January 11, the already intense line of convection consolidated further as instability increased and an upper-level trough approached from the west. A high-end EF2 tornado caused severe damage near Carrollton, Alabama, causing three deaths between two manufactured homes that were demolished. Numerous other tornadoes and hundreds of damaging wind reports were recorded throughout the afternoon, but the squall line began to weaken late on January 11 as the forcing mechanism lifted northeast into the Ohio River Valley and as daytime heating waned.

Confirmed tornadoes

January 10 event

January 11 event

Sligo–Haughton–Sibley–Hurricane, Louisiana

This deadly high-end EF2 tornado first touched down in Sligo north of LA 612 and quickly intensified as it moved northeastward, snapping and uprooting hundreds of trees and damaging several carports and outbuildings. More trees were downed as the tornado clipped the southeast side of the Barksdale Air Force Base, before it reached its peak intensity south of Haughton. Two mobile homes, one double-wide and one single wide, were completely destroyed at high-end EF2 strength as the tornado crossed Davis Road. Two people were killed in the double wide mobile home and one was killed in the single-wide. The tornado continued to cause EF2 damage as it crossed LA 158 in Eastern Bossier Parish, snapping and uprooting hundreds of trees, some of which fell on homes, while other homes suffered roof damage. The tornado then weakened to high-end EF1 strength as it crossed Oliver Road and Camp Zion Road, where numerous trees were snapped and uprooted, siding was ripped off of a single-wide manufactured home. A portion of the metal exterior and doors on the Bossier Parish Fire District 1 Station 6 building was ripped off, along with some vinyl siding to a mobile home living quarters located next door.

The tornado, still at high-end EF1 strength, then moved into Webster Parish, crossing Pilgrim Rest Road, and tracking northeast into the south side of Doyline, downing hundreds of trees as it crossed LA 163 and 164. After clipping the southeast corner of Camp Minden, the tornado ripped through the north side of Sibley along US 371/LA 7 and the northern fringes of Dubberly, where it downed trees and power lines, damaged a metal barn, the roof of a home, and destroyed a shed on Wallraven Road near LA 531. At the South Webster Industrial Park in Sibley, an 18-wheeler trailer was overturned, and a building, fencing, and equipment were damaged at an oil field service company. Significant damage was also done to the major power distribution lines that feed the town of Sibley and the South Webster Industrial District. Just before the tornado crossed I-20 between exits 49 and 52, the rear flank downdraft near and just south of the tornado track grew and intensified, blowing down a large sign onto another 18-wheeler at Love's Truckstop at I-20 Exit 49 (LA 531). After crossing the interstate southeast of Minden, the tornado moved through Nine Forks at the intersection of US 80 and LA 532, rolling a single-wide mobile home on Fuller Cemetery Road and damaging the roofs of two structures. At least 120 broken power poles and over 250 spans of downed wire were the result of this tornado and associated widespread damaging winds near Doyline, Sibley, Dubberly, and Minden.

The tornado then moved into Southwestern Claiborne Parish, causing intermittent damage. Numerous trees were snapped or uprooted as it crossed Harris Road, Old Arcadia Road, Faulk Road, Sherrill Road, and LA 154 in Darley south of Old Athens and Athens. The tornado then turned due east and crossed LA 9, producing partial roof damage to approximately a half dozen chicken houses and shingle and partial roof damage to several other structures, especially off of Buckner Road, Cook Road, and LA 519 in the rural community of Hurricane before finally dissipating.

Three people were killed, and damage was estimated at $1.325 million.

See also
List of North American tornadoes and tornado outbreaks

Notes

References

2020 in Texas
2020 in Louisiana
2020 in Mississippi
Tornadoes in Texas
Tornadoes in Louisiana
Tornadoes in Mississippi
January 2020 events in the United States
2020 natural disasters in the United States
Tornadoes of 2020
F2 tornadoes